The 1st Bersaglieri Division "Italia" was one of four divisions raised by Mussolini's Italian Social Republic. It existed from 25 November 1943 until 29 April 1945.

History 
The Division was formed from Italian POW's in Germany and new conscripts from Northern Italy. The Division was trained in Germany and was only ready for combat in December 1944.

The 14,000 men strong Division was then sent to join the Monterosa Division at the Gothic Line. Many soldiers were from the south of Italy and crossed the frontline to be able to return home. 
Other units fought well and resisted several allied attacks on their positions.

In April 1945 the Gothic Line collapsed under the Spring 1945 offensive in Italy. 
The 1st Italia Division was defeated by the Brazilian Expeditionary Force in the Battle of Collecchio and surrendered.

Commanders
 General Mario Carloni : November 1943 - July 1944,
 General Guido Manardi : July 1944 - February 1945,
 General Mario Carloni : February 1945 - April 1945.

See also
Benito Mussolini
Repubblica Sociale Italiana (Italian Social Republic) [1943-1945]
Esercito Nazionale Repubblicano (Republican National Army)

References

Sources
ITALIA, ITALIA, ITALIA! Flames of War
 Axis history

Infantry divisions of Italy in World War II
Bersaglieri